Hatwal is one of the 36 sub-castes of Sarola Brahmins and their toponymic surname from Hat, a village in the Chamoli district of Uttarakhand, India.

Origin

The Hatwals are one of the 36 sub-castes of Sarola Brahmins from Garhwal who first migrated to the hills of present-day Uttarakhand from the plains of north-western India around the 13th century.

References 

Surnames
Indian surnames
Surnames of Indian origin
Surnames of Hindustani origin
Hindu surnames
Himalayan peoples
Social groups of India
Social groups of Uttarakhand
Brahmin communities of Uttarakhand
Toponymic surnames
People from Chamoli district